The 46 class was a class of mainline electric locomotive built by Metropolitan-Vickers and its partner Beyer, Peacock and Company in England for the New South Wales railways department.

History

The locomotives were built at Bowesfield Works, Stockton-on-Tees, with electrical equipment supplied by Metropolitan-Vickers from its Trafford Park and Sheffield plants. Metropolitan-Vickers drew on experience gained from its earlier British Railways class 76 and 77 electric locomotives, which were used on the Woodhead Line in England and later in the Netherlands.

The locomotives were purchased as part of the electrification of the Main Western line over the Blue Mountains from Penrith to Bowenfels. They hauled passenger services from Sydney Central including from 1970 the Indian Pacific and freight services from Rozelle and Enfield yards.

From January 1960 they also began to operate to Gosford following the electrification of the Main Northern line. This was later extended to Broadmeadow and Newcastle in June 1984.

From 1968 they hauled coal services from Glenlee Colliery on the Main South line and from January 1986 began to operate to Port Kembla following the Illawarra line being electrified.

Demise
Their build quality and durability was such that 38 remained on the books in 1990. By April 1993, a number had been withdrawn and partially stripped with 31 in service or under repair. Following a decision by National Rail to use diesel locomotives on its services over the electrified network, the need for electric locomotives decreased. In December 1994, ten were sold for scrap. The remaining class members had been withdrawn by January 1996.

Performance
They proved to be very reliable and were generally considered superior to the newer and more powerful Comeng 85 class and 86 class locomotives.

Motors and control gear
The 46 class featured six MV 272 traction motors fed current switched by electropneumatic power contactors. The MV 272 motor had six poles and was lap-wound. The driver's traction controls included the accelerating, reversing and regenerating handles. Nineteen starting and five field-weakening resistances were available with the traction motors connected in series, series-parallel and parallel (for a total of seventy-five manually selected power settings, e.g. OFF, starting resistors 1 to 19, all resistors cut out in 20, field-weakening resistors cut in from 21 to 25). Series-parallel comprised two parallel circuits, each of three motors in series, whereas parallel is three parallel circuits of two motors in series. The removable reversing handle controlled the direction of travel and motor connection. Parallel was available only in the forward direction.

Accidents
The 46 class locomotives were involved in a number of serious incidents: 
Investigations revealed that whilst the air brake train pipe was connected from the locomotive to the train, the associated isolating cock was left closed. This rendered the train brakes inoperative.
On 16 January 1976, a freight train hauled by 4623 collided with the rear of a stationary double deck interurban electric multiple unit train at Glenbrook, killing one passenger. This accident was caused by a wrong-side signal failure. The automatic signal behind the EMU displayed "caution" when it should have been at "danger", thereby admitting the following goods train into the occupied signal section.
On 18 January 1977, 4620 was damaged in the Granville rail disaster, which claimed 83 lives. The locomotive was withdrawn and later scrapped.

Preservation
Five locomotives (and one cab) were saved for preservation:

References

Further reading

Beyer, Peacock locomotives
Co-Co locomotives
Electric locomotives of New South Wales
Metropolitan-Vickers locomotives
Railway locomotives introduced in 1956
Standard gauge locomotives of Australia
1500 V DC locomotives